Robert Hetrick (1769–1849) was a poet and blacksmith from Dalmellington, Ayrshire, Scotland. He was known for his patriotic verses written against Napoleon. He published one book, Poems and Songs of Robert Hetrick, in 1826.

References

 Edwards, D.H. Modern Scottish Poets. Series 4 1882 Pages 368-372
 Patterson, James. The Contemporaries of Burns. 1840. Pages 339-341
 Macintosh, John. Poets of Ayrshire. 1910. Pages 46–48

1769 births
1849 deaths
Scottish poets